Fistularioides is an extinct genus of prehistoric bony fish that lived from the early to middle Eocene.

References

Syngnathiformes
Eocene fish
Eocene fish of Europe